Westboro is an unincorporated census-designated place located in the town of Westboro, Taylor County, Wisconsin, United States. Westboro has a post office with ZIP code 54490. As of the 2010 census, its population is 190.

References

Census-designated places in Taylor County, Wisconsin
Census-designated places in Wisconsin